Liza's Back is a live album by Liza Minnelli recorded on April 2, 2002.

It was produced by her then husband, David Gest, and released on CD in the same year by J Records.

Minnelli performed many songs associated with her, and introduced "Liza's Back," written by Minnelli's longtime collaborators, John Kander and Fred Ebb.

Track listing 
"Liza's Back"  - 3:12
"Something Wonderful" (Richard Rodgers, Oscar Hammerstein II)  - 6:07
"Cry" (Churchill Kohlman)  - 2:05
"Don't Cry Out Loud" (Peter Allen, Carole Bayer Sager)  - 2:13
"Crying" (Joe Melson, Roy Orbison)  - 3:38
"City Lights"  - 5:23
"Don't Smoke in Bed"  - 5:07
"Some People" (Jule Styne, Stephen Sondheim)  - 3:42
"Never Never Land"/"Over the Rainbow" (Jule Styne, Betty Comden, Adolph Green)/(Harold Arlen, Yip Harburg)  - 3:44
"What Did I Have That I Don't Have?" (Burton Lane, Alan Jay Lerner)  - 4:43
"Rose's Turn" (Styne, Sondheim)  - 5:05
"Mein Herr"  - 5:34
"Money, Money"  - 1:33
"Maybe This Time"  - 3:19
"Cabaret"  - 5:12
"But the World Goes 'Round"  - 4:30
"Theme from New York, New York"  - 5:41
"I'll Be Seeing You" (Sammy Fain, Irving Kahal)  - 2:32

All songs written by John Kander and Fred Ebb unless otherwise noted.

Note: track times include on stage dialogue between songs.

References

Liza Minnelli live albums
2002 live albums
J Records live albums